The Reytons are an English indie-rock band from Rotherham. Band members include frontman Jonny Yerrell, lead guitarist Joe O'Brien, bass player Lee Holland and drummer Jamie Todd. They formed in 2017. They released their debut album, Kids Off the Estate, on 12 November 2021. It debuted at number eleven on the UK Albums Chart. The second album, What's Rock and Roll?, was released on 20 January 2023.

On 27 January 2023, it was announced that their album What's Rock and Roll? had topped the UK Albums Chart, making it the Reytons' first chart-topping album.

Discography

Studio albums

Extended plays

References

Indie rock groups
Musical groups from Yorkshire and the Humber

de:The Reytons